Boss may refer to:

Occupations 
 Supervisor, often referred to as boss
 Air boss, more formally, air officer, the person in charge of aircraft operations on an aircraft carrier
 Crime boss, the head of a criminal organization
 Fire boss, a person in charge of mine safety
 Pit boss, the person who looks after the employees who work in a casino pit
 Political boss, a person who controls a political region or constituency

Places

United States
 Boss, Missouri, an unincorporated community
 Boss, Texas, an unincorporated community
 Bosstown, Wisconsin, an unincorporated community

Moon
 Boss (crater), a lunar crater

People

As a real name
Boss (surname)
Boss Mustapha, politician, Secretary of Nigerian government

As a nickname or stage name

Athletes
 Lance Armstrong ("", born 1971), former professional cyclist
 Sasha Banks (born 1992), American professional wrestler
 Tomás Boy ("", born 1952), former Mexican professional football player and current coach
 Bobby Lashley (born 1976), American professional wrestler
 Helmut Rahn ("", 1929–2003), German football player
 Andrew Reynolds (skateboarder) (born 1978), American professional skateboarder
 George Steinbrenner (1930–2010), owner of the New York Yankees baseball team
 Jos Verstappen (born 1972), Dutch Formula One driver

Musicians 
 Boss (rapper) (née Lichelle Laws, 1969), American rapper
 Gene Ammons ("The Boss", 1925–1974), American jazz musician and songwriter
 Ross the Boss Friedman (born 1954), guitarist of The Dictators and Manowar
 Diana Ross ("The Boss", born 1944), American singer and actress
 Rick Ross ("The Boss", born 1976), American rapper
 Bruce Springsteen ("The Boss", born 1949), American singer and songwriter

Politicians
 Richard J. Daley (1902–1976), former mayor of Chicago, Illinois, United States 
 Boss Shepherd (Alexander Robey Shepherd, 1835–1902), Washington, D.C., politician
 Boss Tweed (William M. Tweed, 1823–1878), notoriously corrupt New York City politician

Other people
 Hugo Boss (comedian), the artist formerly known as Joe Lycett
 Ernest Shackleton (1874–1922), Anglo-Irish explorer

Arts and entertainment

Fictional characters 
 Boss (Mazinger), from the anime Mazinger Z
 Big Boss (C.O.P.S.), a crime boss from the animated series C.O.P.S.
 Big Boss (Metal Gear), a character in the Metal Gear video game series
 Boss Hogg, the main villain of the television show The Dukes of Hazzard
 Pointy-haired Boss, the office nemesis of cartoon character Dilbert
 The Boss (Metal Gear), a character in the video game Metal Gear Solid 3: Snake Eater
 "The Boss," title bestowed upon the narrator of A Connecticut Yankee in King Arthur's Court
 "The Boss", Nicolas Lucifer III, from the animated series The Baskervilles
 "The Boss" (simply known as "playa" in the first game), the main character of the Saints Row series

Film 
 The Boss (1915 film), a silent film based on a play by Edward Sheldon (see below)
 The Boss (1956 film), an American film by Byron Haskin
 The Boss (1973 film) or Il Boss, an Italian crime film
 The Boss (1975 film) or Boss Nigger, a blaxploitation film
 The Boss, a 2005 short film starring Jennifer Sciole
 Boss (2006 film), an Indian Telugu-language film
 Boss (2011 film), an Indian Kannada-language film
 Boss (2013 Bengali film), an Indian Bengali-language film starring Jeet
 Boss (2013 Hindi film), an Indian Hindi-language film starring Akshay Kumar
 The Boss (2016 film), an American film starring Melissa McCarthy

Music

Bands
 Boss (Australian band), a 1980s hard rock band
 The Boss (band), a South Korean boy band

Albums
 Boss (album), by Magik Markers, 2007
 The Boss (Diana Ross album), 1979
 The Boss (Jimmy Smith album), 1968
 The Boss (Timati album), 2009

Songs
 "Boss" (Fifth Harmony song), 2014
 "Boss" (Lil Pump song), 2017
 "The Boss" (Diana Ross song), 1979
 "The Boss" (Rick Ross song), 2008

 "Boss", a song by the Carters from the album Everything Is Love, 2018
 "The Boss", a song by James Brown from the soundtrack Black Caesar, 1973
 "The Boss", a song by A. R. Rahman from the soundtrack Sivaji, 2007

Television
 Boss (TV series), a 2011 US series starring Kelsey Grammer
 The Boss (TV series) or The Peter Principle, a British television sitcom
 "Boss", an episode of Life's Work
 Bimorphic Organisational Systems Supervisor, fictional supercomputer in the Doctor Who television serial The Green Death

Other
 Boss (video games), a particularly powerful enemy or opponent in a video game
 Boss Radio, a 1960s pop radio format
 Boss: Richard J. Daley of Chicago, a 1971 book by Mike Royko
 The Boss, a 1911 Broadway play by Edward Sheldon

Science and technology
 Boss (geology), a body of igneous rock 
 Boss (engineering), an engineering term for a protrusion type feature
 Boss General Catalogue, An early 20th century star catalog
 BOSS (molecular mechanics) (Biochemical and Organic Simulation System), a molecular modeling program
 Balanced Optical SteadyShot, an image stabilization technology used in Sony video cameras
 Baryon Oscillation Spectroscopic Survey
 BOSS Great Wall, the largest known galaxy wall
 Bharat Operating System Solutions, Linux distribution developed by NRCFOSS/C-DAC, India
 Big Occultable Steerable Satellite, a system for observing distant planets
 Bride of sevenless, a promoter for the sevenless gene
 "Boss", nickname of the robot that won the 2007 DARPA Grand Challenge
 Yahoo! Search BOSS, a web services platform initiative

Other uses 
 Boss (architecture), a protruding stone, often decoratively carved
 Boss (soft drink), a brand of Japanese coffee-flavored beverages
 Boss Audio, a company that manufactures audio equipment for automotive and marine applications
 Boss Corporation, a company that manufactures guitar accessories and audio equipment
 Boulder Outdoor Survival School (BOSS), in Boulder, Utah
 Bureau of State Security (B.O.S.S.), a South African state security agency from 1966 to 1980
 Shield boss, the domed metal centre to a shield
 The Boss (roller coaster), a wooden roller coaster at Six Flags St. Louis
 A series of modified Ford engines used for NASCAR racing, including:
 Ford Boss 302 engine
 Boss 351
 Boss 429
 "Boss", the bone shield of some adult Bovinae bull's horns
 Boss, the bony mass on the skull of some dinosaurs from family Ceratopsidae
 Boss, the hub of a propeller
 Boss, an alternate name for one personality type in the Enneagram of Personality theory
 Hugo Boss, often stylised as BOSS, a German fashion house
 BOSS GP, European motor racing series

See also 
 Bos (disambiguation)
 El Jefe (disambiguation)
 Snoop Dogg ("The Boss Dogg", born 1971), American rapper and record producer
 Vic Sotto, Filipino television personality nicknamed "Bossing"
 Swelling (medical), referred to as bossing
 Ray Traylor (1963–2004), professional wrestler once known as "The Boss"
 Who's the Boss (disambiguation)